Greenland elects on national level a legislature. The Greenlandic Parliament (Inatsisartut in Greenlandic) has 31 members of parliament, elected for a four-year term by proportional representation. Greenland has a multi-party system (disputing on independence and unionism as well as left and right), with numerous parties in which a single party normally does not have a chance of gaining power alone, and therefore the parties must work together in order to form a coalition government.

Greenland has held parliamentary elections since 1979 when the Home-Rule act came into force. when this happened the islands were broken off into eight constituencies: Central Greenland, South Greenland, North Greenland, Ittoqqortoormiit, Qaanaaq, Tasiilaq, Upernavik and Uumannaq. However, in 1998, they were all remerged back into one constituency due to a want to consider Greenland's interests as a whole, instead of the regional interests. 
Due to the number of seats in Greenland's parliament it takes a minimum of sixteen years to form a majority government. Also, terms can be cut short if a government finds a majority against it or if the sitting prime minister decides to call one, and this is fairly normal. For example, an election came unexpectedly in April 2021, as the administration that had been running since 2014 by Kim Kielsen of the Siumut Party, due to the withdrawal of one of its coalition partners, Demokraait.

One of the major debates in Greenland politics is whether to unionise or be independent. This debate divides parties and politicians between two poles. Greenland is currently one of two autonomous territories of the Kingdom of Denmark. This means that Greenland is a part of Denmark's international territory that has a degree of autonomy and self-governance under a national government. Some politicians in Greenland want to become fully independent from Denmark and stand under the independence side of Greenland's politics. On the other hand, some politicians want to keep a strong union with Denmark and remain an autonomous territory.

Latest elections

General elections

Local elections

Danish elections

See also
 Electoral calendar
 Electoral system

References

External links
 Election results from 2002-present (in English)
 Adam Carr's Election Archive
 Parties and Elections in Europe
 Electoral politics, party performance, and governance in Greenland: Parties, personalities, and cleavages in an autonomous subnational island jurisdiction